The Astana City Mäslihat is a unicameral legislature of Kazakhstan’s capital city of Astana. The councillors of the City Mäslihat are elected concurrently with the MP's of the Mazhilis. The City Mäslihat councillors perform their duties by approving plans, economic and social programs for the city's development.

Composition 
The City Mäslihat is composed of 31 councillors who are elected through proportional representation. The law was approved on 29 June 2018 through a constitutional amendment and came into force starting from 1 January 2019.

History 
The Astana City Mäslihat was established on 10 December 1993 after the Supreme Council of Kazakhstan adopted the law "On local representative and executive bodies of the Republic of Kazakhstan", which made significant changes to the name and structure of local state bodies. The city held the elections on 10 March 1994 to elect the councillors of the 1st convocation of the City Mäslihat. Until 2021, the councillors represented single-member constituency and were elected by a secret ballot every 5 years according to the Clause 2 of Article 86 of the Constitution of Kazakhstan, Section VIII "Local state government and self-government". 

In 1998, the city changed its name after it became the new capital of Kazakhstan, making it the Astana City Mäslihat a municipal legislature.

After President Nursultan Nazarbayev's resignation in March 2019, Astana was renamed into Nursultan with City Mäslihat councillors unanimously supporting the change by having the name including hyphen between Nur and Sultan.

In January 2021, the City Mäslihat elections were held where for the first time, 31 councillors were elected on the basis of party-list proportional representation. The Nur Otan swept majority of 26 seats followed by the minor parties of Ak Zhol and People's Party.

Functions 
The City Mäslihat councillors perform their duties on an exempt basis, excluding secretary, who shall be elected from among the council members and shall perform his duties on an exempt basis. The mäslihat has no rights of a legal entity. Within its competence, the mäslihat approves plans, economic and social programs for the city's development, approves and controls the implementation of the budget of the region, regulates land relations, issues of administrative and territorial structure, promotes the implementation by citizens and organizations of the norms of the Constitution of the Republic of Kazakhstan, laws, and acts by the President of Kazakhstan, regulatory actions by the central and local government bodies. The mäslihat exercises its powers at meetings, through the standing committees, chairman of the session and secretary along with the mäslihat councillors.

Commissions 
For the initial examination of the issues submitted for discussion of the sessions, the assistance of the adoption of the decisions of the City Mäslihat and the enforcement of the control functions, the mäslihat includes 4 committees which are:

 Budget, Economy, Industry and Entrepreneurship Issues
 Issues of Legality, Law and Order and Work with the Public
 Construction, Ecology, Transport, Trade and Housing and Communal Services;
 Issues of Social and Cultural Development

Public hearings are conducted in standing committees with the involvement of councillors, executive authorities, associations, the media and people in order to address the most relevant and socially significant issues. In addition, the commissions exercise power over the execution of the decisions of the mäslihat, the programs implemented and other actions of the state authorities and the administration. The standing committees shall be accountable to the mäslihat whom were elected by and are obliged to report their activities yearly. Particular attention shall be paid to the work of councillors with the population at the place of residence. In accordance with current law, the deputies of the mäslihat have an imperative mandate and are obligated to maintain continuous contact with the voters of their electoral district, notify them on a regular basis of the work and the activities of its standing committees and the implementation of the decisions of the mäslihat. Councillors regularly receive voters at their place of residence, who consider their legislative proposals. The procedure for holding the mäslihat sessions, the meetings of its bodies, the establishment and consideration of issues, the composition and election of the mäslihat bodies and other organizational and procedural issues shall be decided by the rules of the mäslihat adopted at the session.

Convocations 
 1st (1994–1999)
 2nd (1999–2004)
 3rd (2004–2007)
 4th (2007–2012)
 5th (2012–2016)
 6th (2016–2021)
7th (2021–present)

References 

Astana
1993 establishments in Kazakhstan